Tallinna FC Olympic Olybet is an Estonian football club, playing in the town of Tallinn.

Current squad

 ''As of 29 October 2017.

League and Cup

References

Football clubs in Tallinn
2000 establishments in Estonia